In statistics, the concept of a concomitant, also called the induced order statistic, arises when one sorts the members of a random sample according to corresponding values of another random sample.

Let (Xi, Yi), i = 1, . . ., n be a random sample from a bivariate distribution. If the sample is ordered by the Xi, then the Y-variate associated with Xr:n will be denoted by Y[r:n] and termed the concomitant of the rth order statistic.

That is, in general, the joint concomitants of order statistics  is dependent, but are conditionally independent given  for all k where . The conditional distribution of the joint concomitants can be derived from the above result by comparing the formula in marginal distribution and hence

References
 
 
 

Theory of probability distributions